Jalan Parit (Perak state route A17) is a major road in Perak, Malaysia.

List of junctions

Parit